Follow the Boys is a 1963 American comedy film directed by Richard Thorpe and starring Connie Francis, Paula Prentiss, and Janis Paige, released by Metro-Goldwyn-Mayer. Shot on location on the French and Italian Riviera, Follow the Boys was MGM's second film vehicle for top recording artist Francis following Where the Boys Are (1960). While Francis' role in the earlier film had been somewhat secondary, she had a distinctly central role in Follow the Boys playing Bonnie Pulaski, a newlywed traveling the Riviera.

Plot
Bonnie visits various ports-of-call in hopes of a rendezvous with her sailor husband (Roger Perry), who is summoned to active duty from their honeymoon. Missing the original point and time of rendezvous in the port of Nice by a few minutes, Bonnie follows the ship to Italy in a somewhat rickety and battered pink 2 CV accompanied by veteran navy wife Janis Paige and two other officers' girlfriends, played by Francis' Where the Boys Are co-star Paula Prentiss and by Dany Robin, who are likewise intent on romantic reunions. Happy endings for each of the ladies are delayed by a series of romantic and comedic misunderstandings.

Paige's husband is played by Ron Randell, with Richard Long and Russ Tamblyn as the respective love interests for Robin and Prentiss.

Cast
 Connie Francis as Bonnie Pulaski 
 Paula Prentiss as Toni Denham.  Follow the Boys was the first instance of Prentiss and her husband Richard Benjamin performing in the same film production, although Benjamin's part as an aide to the admiral did not make the final cut.
 Janis Paige as Liz Bradville
 Dany Robin as Michele Perrier
 Russ Tamblyn as Lt(JG) "Smitty" Smith
 Richard Long as Lt(JG) Pete Langley
 Ron Randell as Lt. Cmdr. Ben Bradville
 Roger Perry as Radarman 3rd Class Billy Pulaski

Production
The movie followed the success of MGM's Where the Boys Are, which was about four women seeking romance in Fort Lauderdale during spring break. It starred Connie Francis and Paula Prentiss, who would be in Follow the Boys.

MGM producer-writer Lawrence Bachman had a vacation home in the south of France. While staying there, he met several Navy wives who lived in Villefranche and spent a lot of their time following their husbands from port to port. This gave him the idea for the movie.

In April 1962 MGM announced the leads would be Connie Francis and Bobby Vee.

In May the cast was to be Francis, Paula Prentiss, Russ Tamblyn and Tom Tully with Richard Thorpe to direct. Jim Hutton was also to star. Ron Randell was cast off the back of his success in MGM's King of Kings. In the end Hutton or Vee did not appear in the final movie.

The film was shot in the south of France and at London's Elstree Studios in August 1962. At the same time, MGM were also making a similar "three girls" romantic comedy featuring a star from Where the Boys Are, Come Fly With Me.

Reception
The Los Angeles Times called it "the least rowdy service comedy I've ever seen." The New York Times said it "lacks sufficient foreground substance to make it anything more than a limp show."

References

External links

Follow the Boys at NY Times Movie Guide

1963 films
1963 comedy films
Films scored by Ron Goodwin
Films directed by Richard Thorpe
Films set on the French Riviera
Metro-Goldwyn-Mayer films
American comedy films
1960s English-language films
1960s American films